Novosphingobium fuchskuhlense  is a Gram-negative and rod-shaped bacterium from the genus Novosphingobium which has been isolated from the lake Grosse Fuchskuhle in Brandenburg in Germany.

References

External links
Type strain of Novosphingobium fuchskuhlense at BacDive -  the Bacterial Diversity Metadatabase	

Bacteria described in 2013
Sphingomonadales